Dato Ho Koh Chye (5 November 1942 – 3 December 2008) was a Malaysian Olympic field hockey goalie. Once ranked the finest goalie in the world. His name is etched in the Malaysian Hall Of Fame for posterity.

Ho represented the Malaysian hockey team in the 1962 Asian Games in Jakarta, in Tokyo during the 1964 Summer Olympics, the 1966 Asian Games in Bangkok, and was the hockey team captain at the 1968 Summer Olympics in Mexico City.

Ho also coached the Malaysian squad to a fourth placing in the 1975 World Cup in Kuala Lumpur, the national hockey team’s best-ever result to date.

His last post before retiring in 1992 was International Preparation Division director. He had also served as the deputy contingent head to the Asian Games in Hiroshima in 1994. Dato Ho was Malaysian Chef-de-Mission to the Beijing Olympics in August 2008.

Ho died on 3 December 2008.

References

External links

 

1942 births
2008 deaths
People from Negeri Sembilan
Malaysian sportspeople of Chinese descent
Malaysian male field hockey players
Olympic field hockey players of Malaysia
Field hockey players at the 1964 Summer Olympics
Field hockey players at the 1968 Summer Olympics
Asian Games medalists in field hockey
Field hockey players at the 1962 Asian Games
Field hockey players at the 1966 Asian Games
Asian Games bronze medalists for Malaysia
Medalists at the 1962 Asian Games